William Arthur McCrae Bruce VC (15 June 1890 – 19 December 1914) was a Scottish recipient of the Victoria Cross, the highest and most prestigious award for gallantry in the face of the enemy that can be awarded to British and Commonwealth forces, following his death in combat during the Battle of Givenchy in France during the First World War.

Born in Edinburgh on 15 June 1890, William Bruce was educated in Jersey, Channel Islands at Victoria College, Jersey. From here, he moved to the Royal Military College, Sandhurst, to complete his officer's training before entering combat during the Great War. Serving with the 59th Scinde Rifles of the Indian Army, he was posthumously awarded the Victoria Cross, the highest military award for valour.

Details
He was 24 years old, and a Lieutenant in the 59th Scinde Rifles, British Indian Army during the First World War when the following deed took place for which he was awarded the VC.

His citation reads:  

Bruce's Victoria Cross was bought by Victoria College, Jersey, the school in which he was educated. The school, in his honour, named one of the original four school houses after him. The others are Sartorius, Braithwaite and Dunlop, all (with the exception of Braithwaite, who was mentioned in dispatches) being old boys and recipients of the V.C. Recently an additional house, Diarmid, was created to honour a previously unknown V.C. recipient. The relevant citations are recited each year on Remembrance Day.

References

Monuments to Courage (David Harvey, 1999)
The Register of the Victoria Cross (This England, 1997)
Scotland's Forgotten Valour (Graham Ross, 1995)
VCs of the First World War: 1914 (Gerald Gliddon, 1994)

British World War I recipients of the Victoria Cross
British Indian Army officers
1890 births
1914 deaths
Graduates of the Royal Military College, Sandhurst
Indian Army personnel killed in World War I
People educated at Victoria College, Jersey
Military personnel from Edinburgh